K-class ferry may refer to:

 Sydney K-class ferry
 British Columbia K-class ferry